Nataliya Khudyakova (born February 8, 1985, in Brovary) is a Ukrainian swimmer, who specialized in freestyle events.

Khudyakova competed for Ukraine in three swimming events at the 2008 Summer Olympics. Leading up to the Games, she cleared FINA B-standard entry time of 2:02.88 (200 m freestyle) at the EDF Swimming Open in Paris and 4:19.67 (400 m freestyle) at the Universiade in Bangkok, Thailand. Khudyakova also teamed up with Darya Stepanyuk, Kateryna Dikidzhi, and Hanna Dzerkal in the 4 × 100 m freestyle relay. Swimming the anchor leg in heat two, Khudyakova recorded a split of 56.54 seconds, and the Ukrainian team went on to finish the prelims in fourteenth overall with a final time of 3:44.72.

In the 400 m freestyle, Khudyakova challenged six other swimmers on the second heat, including two-time Olympian Golda Marcus of El Salvador. She raced to second and thirty-third overall by a quarter of a second (0.25) behind Venezuela's Yanel Pinto in 4:18.34. In her third event, 200 m freestyle, Khudyakova posted her personal best of 2:02.27 to top the first heat by 0.61 of a second ahead of Thailand's Natthanan Junkrajang. Khudyakova failed to advance into the semifinals, as she placed thirty-fifth overall in the preliminaries.

References

External links
NBC Olympics Profile

1985 births
Living people
Ukrainian female swimmers
Olympic swimmers of Ukraine
Swimmers at the 2008 Summer Olympics
Ukrainian female freestyle swimmers
People from Brovary
Sportspeople from Kyiv Oblast